Tillandsia ultima is a species of flowering plant in the genus Tillandsia that is native to Colombia and Ecuador. It was first discovered in Colombia in 1946 in the region of Magdalena.

Description 
Tillandsia ultima is an epiphyte. It is classified as endangered in the Colombian Red Book of Plants according to the IUCN Red List Categories and Criteria Version 3.1.

Habitat 
Tillandsia ultima inhabits the tropical savanna climate and the warm-summer mediterranean climate in Colombia and Ecuador at elevations around 3000 m.

Cultivars 
No cultivars are listed for this species in the BSI Cultivar Registry

References 

ultima
Flora of El Salvador
Flora of Honduras
Epiphytes